Gisela Dulko and María Emilia Salerni were the defending champions, but none competed this year.

Marion Bartoli and Émilie Loit won the title by defeating Els Callens and Katarina Srebotnik 6–4, 6–2 in the final.

Seeds

  Marion Bartoli /  Émilie Loit (champions)
  Els Callens /  Katarina Srebotnik (final)
  Maret Ani /  Silvija Talaja (semifinals)
  Stéphanie Cohen-Aloro /  Patricia Wartusch (semifinals)

Draw

Draw

References
 Official results archive (ITF)
 Official results archive (WTA)

2004 WTA Tour
Morocco Open
2004 in Moroccan tennis